Gornji Nevizdraci (Cyrillic: Горњи Невиздраци) is a village in the municipality of Konjic, Bosnia and Herzegovina.

Demographics 
According to the 2013 census, its population was 138.

References

Populated places in Konjic